St. Andrew's is an area, formerly part of Għargħur, at the borders of Swieqi and Pembroke in Malta. It takes its name from St Andrews Barracks which were part of the Pembroke Army Garrison in the 1900s.

History 

During the early 1900s, St Andrew's had its own adult school for British soldiers called Moynihan House  the birthplace of Berkeley G.A. Moynihan, an internationally acclaimed British abdominal surgeon who served as president of the Royal College of Surgeons of England for many years. Plans to demolish this historic building raised public disdain  with the President, of the Association of Surgeons of Malta, Prof. Joseph Galea asking for it to be saved. Various organisations and personalities raised their concerns about the plans to demolish the building.

January 22, 1916 saw the inauguration of Australia Hall  and adjoining St Andrew's Hospital. A primary school for army children opened at St Andrew's in 1908, which remained in use until 1978.

Location 

St. Andrews as a locality forms part of the much larger town of St. Julian's. The development within the area increased drastically after the year 2000 with many houses being pulled down and converted into apartment blocks.

This location sits on the main road leading to the north of the island.

Sport 

St. Andrews is home to St. Andrews F.C. of the Maltese Premier League, whose home stadium is the UEFA approved Luxol Stadium It is also the home of Luxol St. Andrews Futsal Club.

References 

Towns in Malta
Pembroke, Malta
Swieqi